Cranagh is a village in County Tyrone, Northern Ireland

Cranagh may also refer to:

Cranagh (barony), a barony in the north-west of County Kilkenny, Ireland.

See also
Cranach, a German surname